Bloemendaal railway station is located in Haarlem, on the border of Bloemendaal, the Netherlands. The station was opened on 1 May 1900 on the Haarlem–Uitgeest railway. The station has 2 platforms. The station building now serves as conference and meeting center.

Train services
As of 9 December 2018, the following services call at Bloemendaal:

National Rail

Bus services

External links
NS website 
Dutch public transport travel planner 
http://www.station-bloemendaal.nl

Railway stations in North Holland
Railway stations opened in 1900
Bloemendaal